Shepherd Neame is an English independent brewery which has been based in the market town of Faversham, Kent, for over 300 years. While 1698 is the brewery's official established date, town records show that commercial brewing has occurred on the site since 1573. Since the brewery’s formation back in the 16th century, ownership has passed in unbroken succession through five families. The brewery produces a range of cask ales and filtered beers. Production is around 180,000 brewers' barrels a year. It has 303 pubs and hotels in South East England, predominantly in Kent and London. The company exports to 44 countries including India, Sweden, Italy, Brazil and Canada.

History
The Neame family  were relative latecomers in the overall development of the Shepherd Neame Brewery but, as substantial property owners in the district, Charles Neame of Harefield Court and John Neame of Selling Court were acknowledged to be among the most valuable hop growers in East Kent. Theo Barker explains in the official account of the Brewery, that it all began with a Captain Richard Marsh who in 1678 is recorded in the Faversham Wardmote Books as contributing by far the largest of the ‘Brewers Fines’ made at that date.

Shepherd Neame as such is reported as having been established in 1698, in an advertisement of the Kentish Gazette for 11 April 1865. Richard Marsh lived until 1727 when his Brewery was bequeathed to his widow, and then to his daughter, who sold the property on to Samuel Shepherd around 1741. Samuel Shepherd was from Deal, Kent. He had an interest in malting when he moved to Faversham around 1730 and had established himself as a Brewer of Malt by 1734. Shepherd expanded on his interest, through acquiring a number of public houses, but it was his son, Julius Shepherd, who extended this trend still further upon his inheritance of the Brewery in 1770, when the company held four such outlets. In 1789, he set about modernising the process of malt grinding and pumping, which had been previously worked with the employment of horses, by introducing what was reputed to be the first steam engine (Boulton and Watt) to be used for this purpose outside London, and was then able to describe his business as the Faversham Steam Brewery.

Henry, his second son, born in 1780, continued the family tradition, and raised his son of the same name into the business. It was this Henry Shepherd (1816~77) who was to be the last of the Shepherds actively involved in the Company. The death of Henry senior at the age of eighty-two occurred in 1862 and although his own son was not a businessman of the same determination, the firm's expansion continued adequately with John Mares, who had come to the financial assistance of the Shepherd Brewery during the recession of the mid-1840s and continued as the impetus behind Shepherd and Mares until Percy Beale Neame joined the Brewery in 1864. Mares had seen the potential of the Brewery's growth with the arrival of the long delayed railway service in 1858. He pressed the firm to actively prepare for such growth. Horse-drawn drays were used to carry the Brewery's ales throughout Kent, and malts were imported by barge at Faversham Creek at its own wharf which was also used as the means to deliver its product to London, until the 1850s when steamboats were beginning to prove more expeditious to the task. The railways soon even outpaced and replaced the steamboats.

Mares' unexpected death at the age of 45 in 1864 placed Percy Neame, at the age of 28, as the stronger partner with Henry Shepherd, and with the challenge left to him in Mares' successful expansion programme he brought the Faversham Brewery well into the Neame family's dominion. Jonathan Neame is the fifth generation of his family to run the business. His late father Robert was the company’s first ever President.

Shepherd Neame have embraced 21st-century brewing techniques, for instance using PDX Reactor Technology for the heat treatment of wort, rather than the traditional method, using a calandria. This has led to a reduction in energy consumption of 50%.  Its cask, keg and bottling lines are all equally high tech, utilising robotics and the latest SAP software to minimise use of natural resources, while maximising beer quality. Its cardboard packaging is 100% recyclable and the brewery uses lightweight glass for bottled beer. It also just installed a new state-of-the-art Yeast Propagation Plant which will reduce energy consumption. The brewery has repeatedly pioneered sustainable brewing methods. It recycles 97% of the grain and hops used in the brewing process as animal feed on local farms and holds a Feed Materials Assurance Scheme certificate. Waste is separated into recyclable elements and the waste oil from its managed pubs and the brewery’s kitchens is collected and converted into biofuel. Its Water Recovery Plant, installed in 2014, allows the waste water that results from brewing and cleaning to be recycled, rather than sending it to the drain.

Along with the Three Tuns Brewery in Shropshire, Shepherd Neame claims to the oldest brewery in Great Britain. Three Tuns was licensed in 1642, 56 years earlier than Shepherd Neame. However, there is evidence that brewing has taken place on the Shepherd Neame site since at least 1573, over a century before the establishment of the current brewery.

Brewing  and product range 

The brewery uses chalk-filtered mineral water from the brewery's own artesian well, deep below the brewery, and 93% of the hops used in its beers are grown in Kent. In 2016, its 100-year-old solid oak mash tuns were renovated, with each piece of Burmese teak reshaped around the new stainless steel mash tuns.

As well as beer, it also brews international lagers, under licence, including Samuel Adams Boston Lager, and is the sole UK distributor for premium Thai lager Singha. It is also the sole distributor for Angry Orchard Crisp Apple cider, and collaborates with Somerset’s oldest family cider maker Sheppy’s to produce Orchard View Apple Cider.

Various Shepherd Neame beers are widely available in UK supermarkets, with Bishop's Finger and Spitfire being the most easily found.

Pubs

The brewery has 303 pubs and hotels throughout London and South East England, from the historic heart of the City to the Kent coastline. The brewery's own brands are typically given prominence in terms of frontage with extensive branding. All fonts and pumps bear the distinctive logos and branding, glasses are branded and bar runners that advertise the house beers are commonplace.

See also
 Ivo Neame

References

Sources
 "Bottle of Britain Campaign" (1997–2005)

External links 
 
 RateBeer
 Quaffale

1698 establishments in England
Breweries in England
British Royal Warrant holders
Companies based in Kent
Buildings and structures in Faversham
Tourist attractions in Kent